Pamela Cornell was a set decorator. She was nominated for an Academy Award in the category Best Art Direction for the film Scrooge.

Selected filmography
 Scrooge (1970)

References

External links

Set decorators
Possibly living people
Year of birth missing